Neopanorpa is a paraphyletic genus of around 170 species of scorpionfly in Southeast Asia, nesting the genus Leptopanorpa.

Species
This list is adapted from the World Checklist of extant Mecoptera species: Neopanorpa and complete as of 2018.

 Neopanorpa abdida Byers, 1999 (Myanmar)
 Neopanorpa abstrusa Zhou & Wu, 1993 (China: Zhejiang)
 Neopanorpa acetabulifera Bicha, 2015 (Vietnam)
 Neopanorpa anchoroides Zhou, 2003 (China: Guizhou)
 Neopanorpa angustala Bicha, 2015 (Vietnam)
 Neopanorpa angustiapicula Chau & Byers, 1978 (Java)
 Neopanorpa angustipennis (Westwood, 1842) (Burma, Thailand, Malaysia)
 Neopanorpa annamensis Byers, 1965 (Vietnam)
 Neopanorpa apicata Navás, 1922 (China: Guizhou)
 Neopanorpa arcuatan Bicha, 2019 (Thailand)
 Neopanorpa auriculata Zhou, 2005 (China: Guizhou)
 Neopanorpa auripennisn Bicha, 2019 (Thailand)
 Neopanorpa appendiculata (Westwood, 1846) (India)
 Neopanorpa babai Miyamoto, 1994 (Taiwan)
 Neopanorpa banksi Carpenter, 1938 (China: Sichuan)
 Neopanorpa baviensis Cheng, 1953 (Vietnam)
 Neopanorpa benaci Navás, 1935 (India)
 Neopanorpa breviramus Byers, 1999 (Myanmar: Kachin)
 Neopanorpa borneensis Byers, 1966 (Malaysia: Sabah)
 Neopanorpa brevivalvae Chou & Wang, 1988 (China: Hunan)
 Neopanorpa brisi (Navás, 1930) (China: Sichuan, Yunnan)
 Neopanorpa burmana Byers, 1965 (Myanmar)
 Neopanorpa byersi Webb & Penny, 1979 (Thailand)
 Neopanorpa cangshanensis Zhou, 2006 (China: Guizhou)
 Neopanorpa cantonensis Cheng, 1957 (China: Guangdong)
 Neopanorpa carpenteri Cheng, 1957 (China: Guangdong)
 Neopanorpa cavaleriei (Navás, 1908) (China: Guizhou)
 Neopanorpa caveata Cheng, 1957 (China: Fujian)
 Neopanorpa chaohsiufui Wang % Hua, 2017 (China: Guizhou)
 Neopanorpa chaoi Cheng, 1957 (China: Fujian)
 Neopanorpa chelata Carpenter, 1938 (China: Sichuan)
 Neopanorpa chillcotti Byers, 1971 (Nepal)
 Neopanorpa choui Cheng, 1949 (China: Sichuan)
 Neopanorpa clara Chou & Wang, 1988 (China: Hunan)
 Neopanorpa claripennis Carpenter, 1938 (China: Sichuan)
 Neopanorpa clavata Byers, 1999 (Myanmar: Kachin)
 Neopanorpa contracta Cheng, 1953 (India)
 Neopanorpa cornuta Esben-Petersen, 1915 (India)
 Neopanorpa cucullata Bicha, 2017 (Vietnam)
 Neopanorpa curva Zhou, 2000 (China: Yunnan)
 Neopanorpa crinita Chau & Byers, 1978 (Sumatra)
 Neopanorpa cuspidata Byers, 1965 (Thailand)
 Neopanorpa denticulata Rust & Byers, 1976 (India)
 Neopanorpa diancangshanensis Wang & Hua, 2018 (Myanmar)
 Neopanorpa diloba Chau & Byers 1978 (Java)
 Neopanorpa dispar Issiki & Cheng 1947 (Taiwan)
 Neopanorpa dorsalis Byers 1965 (Vietnam)
 Neopanorpa dubis Chou & Wang 1988 (China: Hunan)
 Neopanorpa echinata Rust & Byers 1976 (India)
 Neopanorpa echinodes Byers, 1999 (Myanmar: Kachin)
 Neopanorpa effusa (Navás, 1914) (India: Sikkim, Bhutan)
 Neopanorpa ellengreeni Bicha, 2017 (Vietnam)
 Neopanorpa fangxianga Zhou & Zhou, 2007 (China: Guizhou)
 Neopanorpa fenestrata (Needham, 1909) (India)
 Neopanorpa fimbriata Byers, 1999 (Myanmar: Kachin)
 Neopanorpa flava Esben-Petersen, 1915 (India: Sikkim)
 Neopanorpa flavicauda Banks, 1931 (Malaysia: Sabah)
 Neopanorpa formosana (Navás, 1911) (Taiwan)
 Neopanorpa formosensis Navás, 1930 (Taiwan)
 Neopanorpa fractura Chau & Byers, 1978 (Sumatra)
 Neopanorpa furcata (Hardwicke, 1825) (Nepal)
 Neopanorpa furcata Zhou, 2005 (China: Guizhou) (unresolved homonymy to Neopanorpa furcata (Hardwicke, 1825))
 Neopanorpa fuscicauda Chau & Byers, 1978 (Java)
 Neopanorpa gestroi Navás, 1929 (Myanmar)
 Neopanorpa gibbosa Rust & Byers, 1976 (India)
 Neopanorpa globulifera Byers, 1982 (Laos)
 Neopanorpa gradana Cheng, 1952 (Taiwan)
 Neopanorpa gulinensis Zhou & Zhou, 2005 (China: Guizhou)
 Neopanorpa hainanica Hua & Chou, 1998 (China: Hainan)
 Neopanorpa harmandi (Navás, 1908) (Thailand, Vietnam)
 Neopanorpa harmandi conjuncta Navás, 1930 (Thailand)
 Neopanorpa hei Zhou & Fan, 1998 (China: Zhejiang)
 Neopanorpa heii Cheng, 1949 (China: Sichuan)
 Neopanorpa hirsuta (Crampton, 1931) (India)
 Neopanorpa hualizhongi Hua & Chou, 1998 (China: Hainan, Guangxi)
 Neopanorpa huangshana Cheng, 1957 (China: Anhui)
 Neopanorpa hunanensis Hua, 2002 (China: Hunan, Guangxi, Guangdong)
 Neopanorpa hushengchangi Hua & Chou, 1999 (Taiwan)
 Neopanorpa hyalinata Esben-Petersen, 1913 (Java)
 Neopanorpa indica Rust & Byers, 1976 (India)
 Neopanorpa infuscata Banks, 1931 (Malaysia (Perak, Pahang), Thailand)
 Neopanorpa jigongshanensis Hua, 1998 (Taiwan)
 Neopanorpa k-maculata Cheng, 1952 (Taiwan)
 Neopanorpa kwangtsehi Cheng, 1957 (China: Fujian)
 Neopanorpa lacunaris Navás, 1930 (China: Yunnan)
 Neopanorpa latipennis Cheng, 1949 (China: Sichuan)
 Neopanorpa leigongshana Zhou & Zhou, 2007 (China: Guizhou)
 Neopanorpa lichuanensis Cheng, 1957 (China: Hubei)
 Neopanorpa lifashengi Hua & Chou, 1999 (China: Tibet)
 Neopanorpa lindsleyi Bicha, 2015 (Vietnam)
 Neopanorpa linjiangensis Zhou, 2005 (China: Guizhou)
 Neopanorpa lipingensis Cai & Hua, 2009 (China: Shaanxi)
 Neopanorpa liquifascia Byers, 1999 (Myanmar: Kachin)
 Neopanorpa lieftincki Chau & Byers, 1978 (Sumatra)
 Neopanorpa linguata Navás, 1914  (Java, Sumatra)
 Neopanorpa longiprocessa Hua & Chou, 1997 (China: Henan)
 Neopanorpa longistipitata Wang & Hua, 2018 (China: Yunnan)
 Neopanorpa lui Chou & Ran, 1981 (China: Shaanxi, Gansu)
 Neopanorpa lungtausana Cheng, 1957 (China: Guangdong)
 Neopanorpa maai Cheng, 1957 (China: Fujian)
 Neopanorpa magna Issiki, 1927 (Taiwan)
 Neopanorpa magnatitilana Wang & Hua, 2018 (China: Yunnan)
 Neopanorpa makii Issiki, 1927 (Taiwan)
 Neopanorpa malaisei Byers, 1999 (Myanmar: Kachin)
 Neopanorpa mangshanensis Chou & Wang, 1988 (China: Hunan)
 Neopanorpa maolanensis Zhou & Bao, 2002 (China: Guizhou)
 Neopanorpa mayangensis Zhou & Zhou, 2010 (China: Guizhou)
 Neopanorpa menghaiensis Zhou & Wu, 1993 (China: Yunnan)
 Neopanorpa minuta Chou & Wang, 1988 (China: Hunan)
 Neopanorpa moganshanensis Zhou & Wu, 1993 (China: Zhejiang)
 Neopanorpa mokansana Cheng, 1957 (China: Zhejiang)
 Neopanorpa montana Zhou, 1993 (China: Zhejiang)
 Neopanorpa mulleri (van der Weele, 1909) (Java)
 Neopanorpa mutabilis Cheng, 1957 (China: Fujian)
 Neopanorpa nielseni Byers, 1965 (Vietnam)
 Neopanorpa nigritis Carpenter, 1938 (China: Sichuan)
 Neopanorpa nipalica (Navás, 1910) (Nepal, India)
 Neopanorpa normpennyin Bicha, 2019 (Thailand)
 Neopanorpa obscura Byers, 1999 (Myanmar: Kachin)
 Neopanorpa ophthalmica (Navás, 1911) (Taiwan)
 Neopanorpa ocellaris (Navás, 1908) (India: Sikkim)
 Neopanorpa ochrura Rust & Byers, 1976 (India)
 Neopanorpa ornata Byers, 1965 (Vietnam)
 Neopanorpa ovata Cheng, 1957 (China: Fujian)
 Neopanorpa pallivalva Zhou, 2003 (China: Guizhou)
 Neopanorpa panda Byers, 1965 (Vietnam)
 Neopanorpa parva Carpenter, 1945 (China: Sichuan)
 Neopanorpa parvula Willmann, 1976 (Vietnam)
 Neopanorpa pendula Qian & Zhou, 2001 (China: Yunnan)
 Neopanorpa pendulifera Byers, 1965 (Thailand)
 Neopanorpa pennyi Byers, 1999 (Myanmar: Kachin)
 Neopanorpa pielina Navás, 1936 (China: Jiangxi)
 Neopanorpa pulchra Carpenter, 1945 (China: Hainan Island)
 Neopanorpa puripennis Chou & Wang, 1988 (China: Hunan)
 Neopanorpa ramulata Byers, 1975 (Bhutan)
 Neopanorpa retina Chou & Li, 1988 (China: Hunan)
 Neopanorpa salai Navás, 1929 (India)
 Neopanorpa sauteri (Esben-Petersen, 1912) (Taiwan)
 Neopanorpa semiorbiculata Wang & Hua, 2018 (China: Yunnan)
 Neopanorpa setigera Wang & Hua, 2018 (China: Sichuan)
 Neopanorpa sheni Hua & Chou, 1997 (China: Henan)
 Neopanorpa siamensis Byers, 1965 (Thailand)
 Neopanorpa similis Byers, 1999 (Myanmar: Kachin)
 Neopanorpa simulans Byers, 2008 (Taiwan)
 Neopanorpa sordida (Needham, 1909) (India)
 Neopanorpa spatulata Byers, 1965  (Thailand)
 Neopanorpa spicata Byers, 1966 (Malaysia: Sabah)
 Neopanorpa subreticulata Miyamoto & Makihara, 1979 (Japan)
 Neopanorpa sumatrana Chau & Byers, 1978 (Sumatra)
 Neopanorpa taoi Cheng, 1949 (China: Sichuan)
 Neopanorpa tengchongensis Zhou & Wu, 1993 (China: Yunnan)
 Neopanorpa tenuis Zhou, 2000 (China: Yunnan)
 Neopanorpa terminata Byers, 1999 (Myanmar: Kachin)
 Neopanorpa thai Byers, 1965 (Thailand)
 Neopanorpa tibetensis Hua & Chou, 1999 (China: Tibet)
 Neopanorpa tienmushana Cheng, 1957 (China: Zhejiang)
 Neopanorpa tienpingshana Chou & Wang, 1988 (China)
 Neopanorpa tincta Wang & Hua, 2018 (China: Yunnan)
 Neopanorpa tiomanensis Byers, 1966 (Malaysia: Tioman Island)
 Neopanorpa translucida Cheng, 1957 (China: Fujian)
 Neopanorpa triangulata Wang & Hua, 2018 (China: Yunnan)
 Neopanorpa tuberosa Byers 1965 (Thailand)
 Neopanorpa umbonata Chau & Byers, 1978 (Sumatra)
 Neopanorpa uncataZhou, 2000 (China: Yunnan)
 Neopanorpa uncinella Qian & Zhou, 2001 (China: Yunnan)
 Neopanorpa validipennis Cheng, 1949 (China: Sichaun)
 Neopanorpa varia Cheng, 1949 (China: Sichuan)
 Neopanorpa vittata Byers, 1999 (Myanmar: Kachin)
 Neopanorpa vietnamensis Willman, 1976 (Vietnam)
 Neopanorpa wangcaensis Zhou & Zhou, 2012 (China: Guizhou)
 Neopanorpa xishuiensis Zhou, 2005 (China: Guizhou)
 Neopanorpa yingjiangensis Zhou, 2000 (China: Yunnan)
 Neopanorpa youngi Byers, 1994 (Taiwan)
 Neopanorpa zebrata Esben-Petersen, 1915 (India)

References

Panorpidae
Insects of Asia